Chris Petrovski is an actor known for his role as Dmitri Petrov on the television series Madam Secretary.

Life and career
While still in high school in New Zealand, Petrovski obtained an agent and was hired as an extra in a production of Spartacus: War of the Damned. For a time, he attended high school at New Zealand's One Tree Hill College, where he performed a role in the school's production of Hamlet. Petrovski graduated from the Unitec Institute of Technology's acting program in New Zealand. He then obtained a scholarship and moved to Los Angeles, California, to attend Stella Adler Acting Academy, from which he graduated. In 2013, he portrayed George Shank in the film All Cheerleaders Die. In 2014, he starred in the film Coldwater.

On Madam Secretary, Petrovski portrayed Dmitri Petrov (seasons 2 & 4; guest season 3, guest season 5), a 24-year-old Russian Army captain who studied at the National War College. In the storyline, Petrov was recruited by Professor Henry McCord (on behalf of the CIA) to become an American spy in exchange for getting his sick sister medical care in Stockholm, Sweden. Dmitri is captured by the Russians and eventually exchanged to the Americans for another traitor to the state. Following his capture Dmitri feels abandoned by Henry and is very angry and bitter toward him. He is placed into a witness protection program under the name Alexander (Alex) Mehranov. In season 4, he gets recruited by the CIA as an analyst.

Filmography 
 The Blacklist (2019) – RAT
 National Justice (2018) 
 Breaking Brooklyn (2018) – Corey
 Barrio (2016) – Carlos
 Madam Secretary (2015–2019) Dmitri Petrov
 In the Moment (2016) – Corey / Cory
 The Body Tree (2017) – Brandon
 Sable (2017) – Colton
 Tourbillion (2016) – Markus
 H8RZ (2015) – Ricky
 Soledad (2014/II) – Jordan
 Loss of Life (2013) – Ricky
 All Cheerleaders Die (2013) – George Shank
 Coldwater (2013) – Gabriel Nunez
 An Easter Bunny Puppy (2013) – Jasper
 Finding Dad (short) (2012/I) – Chris
 Live to Tell (short) (2012) – Brandon
 Pushing Eternity (short) (2012) – John
 Spartacus: War of the Damned (TV Series) (2010) – Slave

References

External links 
 
 

1991 births
Living people
American male film actors
American male television actors
21st-century American male actors